Mini-Reviews in Medicinal Chemistry is a monthly peer-reviewed medical journal covering all aspects of medicinal chemistry. It is published by Bentham Science Publishers and the editors-in-chief are Atta-ur-Rahman (University of Cambridge), M. Iqbal Choudhary (University of Karachi), and George Perry (University of Texas at San Antonio).

Abstracting and indexing 
The journal is abstracted and indexed in:

According to the Journal Citation Reports, the journal has a 2020 impact factor of 3.862.

Controversy concerning Mini-Reviews in Medicinal Chemistry
Mini-Reviews in Medicinal Chemistry employs peer review, however, several scientists have raised concerns about whether it is a predatory journal after being invited to review articles or serve as an editor in areas where they have no scientific expertise.

References

External links

Medicinal chemistry journals
Bentham Science Publishers academic journals
English-language journals
Publications established in 2001
Monthly journals